Ilias Akhomach Chakkour (born 16 April 2004) is a Spanish professional footballer who plays as a winger for Barcelona Atlètic.

Club career 
Born in Els Hostalets de Pierola, Barcelona, Catalonia, Akhomach made his debut for Barcelona B on 7 November 2020, starting a 1–0 away defeat to Andorra in Segunda División B. He was replaced by Nils Mortimer in the 63rd minute.

On 20 November 2021, he was selected in the first team starting line-up, for Xavi's first game as a Barcelona manager, a La Liga derby against Espanyol. In a tense context at the Camp Nou following the departure of Ronald Koeman, he helped his team to a 1–0 win, although he was replaced early in the second half to make way for his fellow Barcelona B winger Abde Ezzalzouli.

International career
Born in Spain, Akhomach is of Moroccan descent. He is an international for Spain's youth national teams. He also played with Morocco U15 national team and won the North African U15 championship in 2018.

Career statistics

Club

References

External links

2004 births
Living people
People from Anoia
Sportspeople from the Province of Barcelona
Spanish footballers
Spain youth international footballers
Spanish sportspeople of Moroccan descent
Association football forwards
FC Barcelona Atlètic players
FC Barcelona players
Segunda División B players
Primera Federación players
La Liga players
Footballers from Catalonia